The 2008 Stanley Cup Finals was the championship series of the National Hockey League's (NHL) 2007–08 season, and the culmination of the 2008 Stanley Cup playoffs. It was contested between the Western Conference champion Detroit Red Wings and the Eastern Conference champion Pittsburgh Penguins. This was Detroit's 23rd appearance in the Finals, and its first since winning the Cup in 2002. This was Pittsburgh's third appearance in the Finals, and its first since winning consecutive Cup championships in 1991 and 1992. The Red Wings defeated the Penguins four games to two to earn the Stanley Cup. Detroit's Henrik Zetterberg was awarded the Conn Smythe Trophy as the Most Valuable Player of the playoffs.

This was Detroit's 11th Stanley Cup title and was also the first Cup Finals between two United States-based NHL teams since 2003.

In the United States, Versus televised games one and two, and NBC broadcast the rest of the series. It was broadcast in Canada on CBC in English and on RDS in French. In the United Kingdom, all games were aired live on Five, and on the cable sports channel NASN. The series was also broadcast by NHL Radio via Westwood One.

Paths to the Finals

The Detroit Red Wings entered the Finals after winning the Presidents' Trophy as the team that had the best record during the regular season. Led by forwards Henrik Zetterberg, Pavel Datsyuk, and Johan Franzen, Detroit scored 55 goals in the first three rounds of the playoffs. With struggling goaltender Dominik Hasek being replaced mid-series by Chris Osgood, the Red Wings defeated their division rival Nashville Predators in the Western Conference Quarterfinals, in six games. The team swept the Colorado Avalanche in the Western Conference Semifinals, in which Franzen scored nine goals – tying with the entire Avalanche squad, who also scored nine goals in the series. The Red Wings then defeated the Dallas Stars in six games to win their fifth Clarence S. Campbell Bowl in franchise history.

The Pittsburgh Penguins entered the championship series after winning the Atlantic Division and earning the second-best regular season record in the Eastern Conference. The team was led by Sidney Crosby; missing 29 games throughout the regular season because of an ankle injury, the captain returned to lead the first three rounds of the playoffs in assists, and to tie for the lead in points heading into the Stanley Cup Finals. Goaltender Marc-Andre Fleury recorded three shutouts throughout the playoffs, to lead the league in that category. Evgeni Malkin and Marian Hossa each recorded nine goals and ten assists throughout the playoffs. The Penguins swept the Ottawa Senators in the Eastern Conference Quarterfinals, a reversal of the series of the previous season when Ottawa beat Pittsburgh 4–1. In the Eastern Conference Semifinals, the Penguins defeated division rival the New York Rangers, in five games. The team won the Prince of Wales Trophy by defeating another division rival, their in-state rivals, and another fierce rival of the Rangers, the Philadelphia Flyers, also in five games.

Game summaries
The 2008 Stanley Cup Finals marked the first time that the Detroit Red Wings and the Pittsburgh Penguins met in postseason play, and the first time since the 1909 World Series that professional sports teams from Detroit and Pittsburgh met in a postseason series or game. The Red Wings and Penguins did not play each other during the 2007–08 regular season.

Game one

Pittsburgh's Gary Roberts and Detroit's Chris Chelios were both healthy scratches for game one. Prior to the game, a ceremonial faceoff featuring former Pittsburgh captain and current team chairman Mario Lemieux and former Detroit captain and team vice president at the time Steve Yzerman. Each dropped a puck to their current captains Sidney Crosby and Nicklas Lidstrom, respectively.

At 15:20 into the first period, a goal scored by Lidstrom was waved off after Tomas Holmstrom was called for goaltender interference. The remainder of the first period went scoreless, as Pittsburgh failed to capitalize on four consecutive power plays. At 13:01 into the second period, Mikael Samuelsson gave the Red Wings the unassisted game-winning goal, on a wrap-around. Just over two minutes into the third period, Samuelsson added his second unassisted goal of the game. At 17:18 into the third period, Dan Cleary scored shorthanded to give the Red Wings a 3–0 lead. Henrik Zetterberg scored on the power-play with 13 seconds remaining. Chris Osgood recorded his second shutout of the playoffs, to give the Red Wings a 4–0 victory in game one. The Red Wings outshot the Penguins 36–19.

Game one summary
First period:
Scoring: None
Penalties: Kris Letang, Pittsburgh (Interference) 3:51; Tomas Holmstrom, Detroit (High sticking) 4:02; Nicklas Lidstrom, Detroit (Hooking) 10:15; Darren Helm, Detroit (Tripping) 12:38; Tomas Holmstrom, Detroit (Interference) 15:20; Hal Gill, Pittsburgh (High sticking) 19:00
Second period:
Scoring: (1) Detroit: Mikael Samuelsson (unassisted) 13:01
Penalties: Sidney Crosby, Pittsburgh (Slashing) 1:55; Ryan Whitney, Pittsburgh (Holding) 13:13; Evgeni Malkin, Pittsburgh (Tripping)
Third period:
Scoring: (2) Detroit: Mikael Samuelsson 2:16 (unassisted); (3) Dan Cleary (Brad Stuart) SHG 17:18; (4) Henrik Zetterberg (Tomas Holmstrom, Nicklas Lidstrom) PPG 19:47
Penalties: Nicklas Lidstrom, Detroit (Interference) 15:27; Jarkko Ruutu, Pittsburgh (Slashing) 18:08
Goalie Statistics:
Detroit: Chris Osgood — Shutout (Second of playoffs), 19 saves / 19 shots
Pittsburgh: Marc-Andre Fleury — 32 saves / 36 shots
Shots by Period:
{| style="width:20em; text-align:right;"
! style="width:8em; text-align:left;" | Team
! style="width:3em;" | 1
! style="width:3em;" | 2
! style="width:3em;" | 3
! style="width:3em;" | T
|-
| align="left" | Pittsburgh || 12 || 4 || 3 || 19
|-
| align="left" | Detroit || 11 || 16 || 9 || 36
|}

Game two

In preparation for game two, head coach Michel Therrien revised Pittsburgh's lines; the revision included Gary Roberts who did not play in game one. Johan Franzen, the leading goal-scorer in the playoffs, returned to the line-up for Detroit.

Detroit's Brad Stuart scored the first goal of the game 6:55 into the first period, on a slap shot, with an assist from Valtteri Filppula. Tomas Holmstrom added a goal at 11:18 into the first period, to put Detroit up 2–0. Pittsburgh struggled throughout the period, failing to get a shot on goal for the game's first twelve minutes. Detroit outshot the Penguins 11–6 in the second period, but both teams failed to score. At 8:48 into the third period, Valtteri Filppula scored his first goal of the series, beating goaltender Marc-Andre Fleury with a wrist-shot. Chris Osgood recorded his second consecutive shutout, stopping all 22 shots faced.

Game two summary

First period:
Scoring: (1) Detroit: Brad Stuart 1 (Valtteri Filppula) 6:55; (2) Tomas Holmstrom 4 (Henrik Zetterberg) 11:18
Penalties: Brad Stuart, Detroit (Tripping) 11:33; Ryan Malone, Pittsburgh (Interference) 15:14; Daniel Cleary, Detroit (Hooking) 17:49; Gary Roberts, Pittsburgh (Roughing) 19:46
Second period:
Scoring: None
Penalties: Brooks Orpik, Pittsburgh (Roughing) 11:17; Tomas Holmstrom, Detroit (Slashing) 11:17; Ryan Malone, Pittsburgh (Slashing) 17:30
Third period:
Scoring: (3) Detroit: Valtteri Filppula 4 (Johan Franzen, Brad Stuart) 8:48
Penalties: Marian Hossa, Pittsburgh (Holding) 0:22; Ryan Malone, Pittsburgh (Roughing) 3:42; Pavel Datsyuk, Detroit (Roughing) 3:42; Dallas Drake, Detroit (Tripping) 7:49; Ryan Malone, Pittsburgh (Goaltender Interference) 8:04; Maxime Talbot (served by Tyler Kennedy), Pittsburgh (Roughing) 11:51; Maxime Talbot, Pittsburgh (Roughing) 11:51; Johan Franzen, Detroit (Roughing) 11:51; Ryan Whitney, Pittsburgh (Roughing) 16:08; Petr Sykora, Pittsburgh (Goaltender interference) 18:52; Johan Franzen, Detroit (Roughing) 18:52; Andreas Lilja, Detroit (Roughing) 18:52; Evgeni Malkin, Pittsburgh (Roughing) 18:52; Gary Roberts, Pittsburgh (Roughing) 18:52; Gary Roberts, Pittsburgh (10 Minute Misconduct) 18:52; Maxime Talbot, Pittsburgh (10 Minute Misconduct) 20:00
Goalie statistics:
Detroit: Chris Osgood — Shutout (third of playoffs), 22 saves / 22 shots
Pittsburgh: Marc-Andre Fleury — 31 saves / 34 shots
Shots by period:
{| style="width:20em; text-align:right;"
! style="width:8em; text-align:left;" | Team
! style="width:3em;" | 1
! style="width:3em;" | 2
! style="width:3em;" | 3
! style="width:3em;" | T
|-
| align="left" | Pittsburgh || 6 || 6 || 10 || 22
|-
| align="left" | Detroit || 12 || 11 || 11 || 34
|}

Game three

Game three was held in Pittsburgh, where going into the matchup the Penguins had won sixteen consecutive home games. Pittsburgh continued to shuffle their lineup by replacing defenceman Kris Letang with veteran Darryl Sydor, but going back to the top line combinations from game one. Penguins captain Sidney Crosby scored the team's first goal of the series late in the first period, with an assist from Marian Hossa. The Penguins went up 2-0 after Crosby scored a second time, his second coming on the power-play, just 2:34 into the second period. Johan Franzen pulled the Red Wings within one, when he scored on the power-play at 14:48 of the second period. Adam Hall scored his second goal of the post season, when the Penguins winger scored at 7:18 of the third period, putting his team up 3–1. Mikael Samuelsson scored a second goal for the Red Wings, with assists from Brad Stuart and Valtteri Filppula. However, Pittsburgh's 3–2 lead held, giving the team their first victory of the series. Despite winning the game, Pittsburgh was outshot by the Red Wings for the third consecutive game by at least 10 shots.

Game three summary
First period:
Scoring: (1) Pittsburgh: Sidney Crosby (Marian Hossa) 17:25
Penalties: Johan Franzen, Detroit (Holding) 1:04; Jordan Staal, Pittsburgh (Holding) 3:05; Sergei Gonchar, Pittsburgh (Hooking) 12:07; Brian Rafalski (Tripping) 19:19.
Second period:
Scoring: (2) Pittsburgh: Sidney Crosby (Marian Hossa, Ryan Malone) PPG 2:34; (1) Detroit: Johan Franzen (Nicklas Lidstrom, Niklas Kronwall) PPG 14:48
Penalties: Niklas Kronwall, Detroit (Hooking) 2:02; Hal Gill, Pittsburgh (Cross checking) 8:54; Hal Gill, Pittsburgh (Cross checking) 12:57
Third period:
Scoring: (3) Pittsburgh: Adam Hall (Maxime Talbot, Gary Roberts) 7:18; (2) Detroit: Mikael Samuelsson (Brad Stuart, Valtteri Filppula) 13:37
Penalties: Evgeni Malkin, Pittsburgh (Hooking) 15:42
Goalie statistics:
Detroit: Chris Osgood — 21 saves / 24 shots
Pittsburgh: Marc-Andre Fleury — 32 saves / 34 shots
Shots by period:
{| style="width:20em; text-align:right;"
! style="width:8em; text-align:left;" | Team
! style="width:3em;" | 1
! style="width:3em;" | 2
! style="width:3em;" | 3
! style="width:3em;" | T
|-
| align="left" | Pittsburgh || 6 || 13 || 5 || 24
|-
| align="left" | Detroit || 9 || 9 || 16 || 34
|}

Game four

Entering Game Four, Petr Sykora said the game was a must-win for the Penguins, "For us, basically, [game four] is a do-or-die game". Jiri Hudler's game-winning goal at 2:26 of the third period broke a 1–1 tie, and the Red Wings killed off a Penguins 1:26 5-on-3 advantage midway through the final period to help preserve the victory, thanks in large part to a terrific defensive play by Henrik Zetterberg on Sidney Crosby, preventing what would have been a tap-in goal when he tied up Crosby's stick at the front of the net. Pittsburgh scored first on Marian Hossa's power play goal 2:51 into the game before Nicklas Lidstrom tied the game at 7:06 of the first period.

Game four summary

First period:
Scoring: (1) Pittsburgh: Marian Hossa (Sergei Gonchar, Sidney Crosby) PPG 2:51; (1) Detroit: Nicklas Lidstrom (Brian Rafalski, Pavel Datsyuk) 7:06
Penalties: Dallas Drake, Detroit (Roughing) 2:11; Pascal Dupuis, Pittsburgh (Cross checking) 5:04; Brian Rafalski, Detroit (Roughing) 9:03; Kris Draper, Detroit (Holding) 14:28; Maxime Talbot, Pittsburgh (Diving) 16:59; Brett Lebda, Detroit (Cross checking) 16:59; Brooks Orpik, Pittsburgh (Roughing) 17:55; Johan Franzen, Detroit (Elbowing) 17:55
Second period:
Scoring: None
Penalties: Jordan Staal, Pittsburgh (Interference) 3:44; Brian Rafalski, Detroit (Holding) 16:04
Third period:
Scoring: (2) Detroit: Jiri Hudler (Darren Helm, Brad Stuart) 2:26
Penalties: Marc-Andre Fleury (served by Marian Hossa), Pittsburgh (Delay of Game) 4:08; Kirk Maltby, Detroit (Hooking) 9:36; Andreas Lilja, Detroit (Interference) 10:10
Goalie statistics:
Detroit: Chris Osgood — 22 saves / 23 shots
Pittsburgh: Marc-Andre Fleury — 28 saves / 30 shots
Shots by period:
{| style="width:20em; text-align:right;"
! style="width:8em; text-align:left;" | Team
! style="width:3em;" | 1
! style="width:3em;" | 2
! style="width:3em;" | 3
! style="width:3em;" | T
|-
| align="left" | Pittsburgh || 9 || 8 || 6 || 23
|-
| align="left" | Detroit || 14 || 7 || 9 || 30
|}

Game five

Pittsburgh's Marian Hossa scored the first goal of the game at 8:37 into the first period. Teammate Adam Hall added his second goal of the series at 14:41 of the first period, giving the Penguins a 2–0 lead. Detroit then scored three consecutive goals—by Darren Helm, Pavel Datsyuk, and Brian Rafalski—to gain the lead. After Pittsburgh pulled its goalie with less than one minute remaining in regulation, Maxime Talbot scored with 34.3 seconds remaining to tie the game and force overtime. The goal marked only the second time in NHL history that a team avoided elimination in the Finals by scoring in the last minute of the third period. The first two overtime periods were scoreless, and the game went into the third overtime with Detroit killing two consecutive penalties, and Pittsburgh killing one. At the 9:21 mark, Pittsburgh's Petr Sykora scored the game-winning goal on another power-play, forcing the series back to Pittsburgh for game six. The goal was assisted by defenceman Sergei Gonchar, who was playing his first shift in forty minutes as a result of an injury, and Evgeni Malkin, who got his first point of the Finals. Pittsburgh became the first team in modern NHL history to have three overtime power-plays in the Finals. Goaltenders Marc-Andre Fleury and Chris Osgood stopped 55 and 28 shots, respectively. The triple overtime game was the fifth-longest in Stanley Cup Finals history.

Game five summary

First period
Scoring: (1) Pittsburgh: Marian Hossa (Sidney Crosby, Pascal Dupuis) 8:37; (2) Pittsburgh: Adam Hall 14:41.
Penalties: Brooks Orpik, Pittsburgh (Hooking) 2:08; Pittsburgh (Too Many Men) (served by Tyler Kennedy) 4:15; Pavel Datsyuk, Detroit (Tripping) 5:24; Kirk Maltby, Detroit (Roughing) 10:50; Maxime Talbot, Pittsburgh (Roughing) 10:50.
Second period
Scoring: (1) Detroit: Darren Helm (Kirk Maltby) 2:54.
Penalties: Kirk Maltby, Detroit (Interference) 5:48; Sidney Crosby, Pittsburgh (High Sticking) 10:18.
Third period
Scoring: (2) Detroit: Pavel Datsyuk (Henrik Zetterberg, Brian Rafalski) PPG 6:43; (3) Detroit: Brian Rafalski (Johan Franzen, Henrik Zetterberg) 9:23; (3) Pittsburgh: Maxime Talbot (Marian Hossa, Sidney Crosby) 19:25
Penalties: Tyler Kennedy, Pittsburgh (Hooking) 6:21
First overtime
Scoring: None
Penalties: Henrik Zetterberg, Detroit (Interference) 17:25
Second overtime
Scoring: None
Penalties: Daniel Cleary, Detroit (Interference) 3:41, Petr Sykora, Pittsburgh (Hooking) 17:44
Third overtime
Scoring: (4) Pittsburgh: Petr Sykora (Evgeni Malkin, Sergei Gonchar) PPG 9:57
Penalties: Jiri Hudler, Detroit (High sticking — double-minor) 9:21
Goalie statistics:
Detroit: Chris Osgood — 28 saves / 32 shots
Pittsburgh: Marc-Andre Fleury — 55 saves / 58 shots
Shots by period:
{| style="width:29em; text-align:right;"
! style="width:8em; text-align:left;" | Team
! style="width:3em;" | 1
! style="width:3em;" | 2
! style="width:3em;" | 3
! style="width:3em;" | OT1
! style="width:3em;" | OT2
! style="width:3em;" | OT3
! style="width:3em;" | T
|-
| align="left" | Pittsburgh || 7 || 7 || 4 || 2 || 8 || 4 || 32
|-
| align="left" | Detroit || 8 || 12 || 14 || 13 || 7 || 4 || 58
|}

Game six

Pittsburgh's Ryan Malone was scheduled to have X-rays on June 3, after being hit in the face with the puck in game five, but was expected to play.

The Red Wings took a 2–0 lead in the second period in game six en route to a 3–2 victory to clinch the Stanley Cup. Brian Rafalski scored a power play goal at 5:03 in the first period before Valtteri Filppula extended the lead with a goal at 8:07 in the second. The Penguins had an opportunity to get their first goal later in the first period, with a 5-on-3 advantage for 1:33, but could not convert. Pittsburgh finally cut the lead at 15:26 of the second period with Evgeni Malkin's power play goal. However, a third period shot by Detroit's Henrik Zetterberg squeezed through the legs of Pittsburgh goaltender Marc-Andre Fleury, who, after noticing he was not covering the puck, fell backwards and accidentally knocked the puck across the goal line for the Red Wings' third goal. Marian Hossa scored a power play goal (in addition to the Penguins pulling Fleury for an extra attacker and the Red Wings' Andreas Lilja having lost his stick as a result of Malone knocking it out of his hands) at 18:33 of the third period to cut the lead to 3–2, but the Penguins, despite a shot by Sidney Crosby and shot off rebound by Hossa in the final seconds, could not tie the game before time ran out. Lidstrom became the first European-born Stanley Cup captain.

The Wings' victory also saw the Triple Gold Club, made up of individuals who have won the Stanley Cup plus gold medals at the Olympics and World Championships, gain three new members. Niklas Kronwall, Mikael Samuelsson, and Zetterberg had previously won the other two components with the Sweden national team in 2006 at that year's Olympics and World Championships.

Game six summary
First period
Scoring: Detroit: Brian Rafalski (Henrik Zetterberg, Pavel Datsyuk) PPG 5:03
Penalties: Darryl Sydor, Pittsburgh (Interference) 04:17; Dallas Drake, Detroit (Charging) 08:28; Kris Draper, Detroit (Roughing) 08:55; Adam Hall, Pittsburgh (Hi-sticking) 11:15
Second period
Scoring: Detroit: Valtteri Filppula (Mikael Samuelsson, Niklas Kronwall) 8:07; Pittsburgh: Evgeni Malkin (Sidney Crosby, Marian Hossa) PPG 15:26
Penalties: Andreas Lilja, Detroit (Slashing) 02:06; Pavel Datsyuk, Detroit (Interference) 14:22; Gary Roberts, Pittsburgh (Hi-sticking) 16:13; Johan Franzen, Detroit (Roughing) 17:58; Brooks Orpik, Pittsburgh (Roughing) 17:58;
Third period
Scoring: Detroit: Henrik Zetterberg (Pavel Datsyuk, Niklas Kronwall) 7:36; Pittsburgh: Marian Hossa (Sergei Gonchar, Evgeni Malkin) PPG 18:33
Penalties: Jiri Hudler, Detroit (Hooking) 18:13
Goalie statistics:
Detroit: Chris Osgood — 20 saves / 22 shots
Pittsburgh: Marc-Andre Fleury — 27 saves / 30 shots
Shots by period:
{| style="width:20em; text-align:right;"
! style="width:8em; text-align:left;" | Team
! style="width:3em;" | 1
! style="width:3em;" | 2
! style="width:3em;" | 3
! style="width:3em;" | T
|-
| align="left" | Detroit || 9 || 9 || 12 || 30
|-
| align="left" | Pittsburgh || 8 || 8 || 6 || 22
|}

Television
In the United States, Versus aired games one and two while NBC televised the remainder of the series. Game one of the 2008 Stanley Cup Finals had a 1.8 rating, drawing 2.3 million viewers. The rating was a 157% increase over the previous Playoff Finals opener, and a 100% rise from two years previous. Game two had a 1.9 rating, drawing 2.5 million viewers. It was the highest-rated and most-watched cable telecast of the Finals in six years in the United States. The rating was the highest for an NHL game on Versus and the second highest rating for a Versus broadcast ever only to Lance Armstrong's seventh straight Tour de France victory in 2005 (2.1). Game three drew a 2.8 rating, representing an 87% increase over the previous year's game three. In Detroit, game three drew higher ratings (18.2) than game five of the 2008 NBA Eastern Conference Finals between the Detroit Pistons and the Boston Celtics (15.9). Game four earned a 2.3 rating, up 21% over the previous year's game four. Game five drew a 4.3 rating, representing a 79% increase from the previous year's game five. It drew the highest ratings for a game five since 2002.
Game six had a 4.4 rating, the best performance in a game six since 2000. It was a 100% increase over game six of 2006 and was the highest rated game for NBC since they reacquired the NHL broadcasting rights in 2004.

On the CBC in Canada, this was the last Stanley Cup Finals that Bob Cole served as the play-by-play announcer for, as Jim Hughson took over the following year.

Team rosters
Years indicated in boldface under the "Finals appearance" column signify that the player won the Stanley Cup in the given year.

Pittsburgh Penguins

Detroit Red Wings

Stanley Cup engraving

The 2008 Stanley Cup was presented to Red Wings captain Nicklas Lidstrom by NHL Commissioner Gary Bettman following the Red Wings 3–2 win over the Penguins in game six.

The following Red Wings players and staff had their names engraved on the Stanley Cup

2007–08 Detroit Red Wings

 #44 Mark Hartigan (C – played 23 games, 4 playoff games of Detroit, 48 games in the minors) – was left off for the 2nd year in row for not playing in the last 2 rounds of the playoffs.
 #52 Jonathan Ericsson (D – played 8 games for Detroit, 69 games in the minors),
 #4 Kyle Quincey (D – played 6 games for Detroit, 66 games in the minors),
 #35 Jimmy Howard (G – played 4 games for Detroit, 54 games in the minors), 
 #8 Justin Abdelkader (LW – 2 games for Detroit, 48 games for Michigan State University.), 
 #43 Mattias Ritola (LW – played 2 games for Detroit and 72 games in minors),
 #46 Jakub Kindl (D – played 76 in minors, no games for Detroit),
 Sergie Tchekmarev (Team Masseur), Lynn Newman (Massage Therapist) – Rick Szuber (Equipment Assistant) All 10 members were left off the Stanley Cup, but received Stanley Cup Rings.

See also
2007–08 Detroit Red Wings season
2007–08 Pittsburgh Penguins season

References

 
Stanley Cup Finals
Stanley Cup Finals
Pittsburgh Penguins games
Detroit Red Wings games
Ice hockey competitions in Detroit
Ice hockey competitions in Pittsburgh
2000s in Pittsburgh
Stanley Cup Finals
Stanley Cup Finals
Stanley Cup Finals
Stanley Cup Finals
Stanley Cup Finals